The 1988 City of Dundee District Council election took place on 5 May 1988 to elect members of City of Dundee Council, as part of that year's Scottish local elections.

Election results

References

1988
1988 Scottish local elections
20th century in Dundee